Balarampur Assembly constituency is an assembly constituency in Purulia district in the Indian state of West Bengal.

Overview
As per orders of the Delimitation Commission, No. 239 Balarampur Assembly constituency is composed of the following: Balarampur community development block; Chakaltore, Dimdiha, Durku, Garafusra, Lagda and Sonaijuri gram panchayats of Purulia I community development block; and 3. Chatu Hansa, Hensla and Puara gram panchayats of Arsa community development block.

Balarampur Assembly constituency is part of No. 35 Purulia (Lok Sabha constituency).

Members of Legislative Assembly

Election results

2021

2016

2011

 

Uttam Banerjee, contesting as an independent candidate, was a rebel Congress candidate.

.# Swing calculated on Congress+Trinamool Congress vote percentages taken together in 2006.

1977-2006
In the 2006, 2001, 1996 and 1991 state assembly elections Bhandu Majhi  of CPI(M) won the Balarampur assembly seat defeating his nearest rivals Barjuram Ram Singh Sardar of Trinamool Congress, Lambodar Mandi of Trinamool Congress, Dulali Mandi of Congress, and Subhas Mudi of Congress respectively. Contests in most years were multi cornered but only winners and runners are being mentioned. Bikram Tudu of CPI(M) defeated Rasik Chandra Majhi of Congress in 1987, and Rup Singh Majhi of Congress in 1982 and 1977.

1957-1972
Rup Singh Majhi of Congress won in 1972. Bikram Tudu of CPI(M) won in 1971. Gobardhan Majhi of Lok Sewak Sangh/ Independent won in 1969 and 1967. Padak Mahata of LSS won in 1962. Bhim Chandra Mahato, Independent, won in 1957. Prior to that the Balarampur seat was not there.

References

Assembly constituencies of West Bengal
Politics of Purulia district